Aquellos años locos  (also known as Those Crazy Years in USA) is a 1971  Argentine musical comedy film directed and written by Enrique Carreras with Norberto Aroldi.   The film premiered on 30 July 1971 in Buenos Aires and stars Palito Ortega and Mercedes Carreras. The movie was filmed in Mar del Plata, Buenos Aires.

Cast
 Palito Ortega
 Mercedes Carreras
 Elvia Andreoli
 Tono Andreu
 Marta Cipriano
 Emilio Comte
 Daniel de Alvarado
 Aurora Del Mar
 Dorys del Valle
 Ivan Grey
 Norma López Monet
 Lalo Malcolm
 Domingo Márquez
 María de los Ángeles Medrano
 Ernesto Raquén
 Raúl Rossi
 Óscar Rovito
 Mario Sapag
 Paquita Vehil

References

External links
 
 Aquellos años locos at film.com
 Aquellos años locos at HOLLYWOOD.COM

1971 films
1970s Spanish-language films
Tango films
1970s musical comedy films
1970s dance films
Argentine musical comedy films
1971 comedy films
1970s Argentine films
Films directed by Enrique Carreras